Signal-to-noise ratio (SNR or S/N) is a measure used in science and engineering that compares the level of a desired signal to the level of background noise. SNR is defined as the ratio of signal power to the noise power, often expressed in decibels. A ratio higher than 1:1 (greater than 0 dB) indicates more signal than noise.

SNR, bandwidth, and channel capacity of a communication channel are connected by the Shannon–Hartley theorem.

Definition

Signal-to-noise ratio is defined as the ratio of the power of a signal (meaningful input) to the power of background noise (meaningless or unwanted input):

where  is average power. Both signal and noise power must be measured at the same or equivalent points in a system, and within the same system bandwidth.

Depending on whether the signal is a constant or a random variable, the signal-to-noise ratio for random noise  becomes:

or

If the noise has expected value of zero, as is common, the denominator is its variance, the square of its standard deviation .

The signal and the noise must be measured the same way, for example as voltages across the same impedance. The root mean squares can alternatively be used in the ratio:

where  is root mean square (RMS) amplitude (for example, RMS voltage).

Decibels
Because many signals have a very wide dynamic range, signals are often expressed using the logarithmic decibel scale. Based upon the definition of decibel, signal and noise may be expressed in decibels (dB) as

and

In a similar manner, SNR may be expressed in decibels as

Using the definition of SNR

Using the quotient rule for logarithms

Substituting the definitions of SNR, signal, and noise in decibels into the above equation results in an important formula for calculating the signal to noise ratio in decibels, when the signal and noise are also in decibels:

In the above formula, P is measured in units of power, such as watts (W) or milliwatts (mW), and the signal-to-noise ratio is a pure number.

However, when the signal and noise are measured in volts (V) or amperes (A), which are measures of amplitude, they must first be squared to obtain a quantity proportional to power, as shown below:

Dynamic range
The concepts of signal-to-noise ratio and dynamic range are closely related. Dynamic range measures the ratio between the strongest un-distorted signal on a channel and the minimum discernible signal, which for most purposes is the noise level. SNR measures the ratio between an arbitrary signal level (not necessarily the most powerful signal possible) and noise. Measuring signal-to-noise ratios requires the selection of a representative or reference signal. In audio engineering, the reference signal is usually a sine wave at a standardized nominal or alignment level, such as 1 kHz at +4 dBu (1.228 VRMS).

SNR is usually taken to indicate an average signal-to-noise ratio, as it is possible that instantaneous signal-to-noise ratios will be considerably different. The concept can be understood as normalizing the noise level to 1 (0 dB) and measuring how far the signal 'stands out'.

Difference from conventional power
In physics, the average power of an AC signal is defined as the average value of voltage times current; for resistive (non-reactive) circuits, where voltage and current are in phase, this is equivalent to the product of the rms voltage and current:

But in signal processing and communication, one usually assumes that   so that factor is usually not included while measuring power or energy of a signal. This may cause some confusion among readers, but the resistance factor is not significant for typical operations performed in signal processing, or for computing power ratios. For most cases, the power of a signal would be considered to be simply

Alternative definition 
An alternative definition of SNR is as the reciprocal of the coefficient of variation, i.e., the ratio of mean to standard deviation of a signal or measurement:

Notice that such an alternative definition is only useful for variables that are always non-negative (such as photon counts and luminance), and it is only an approximation since . It is commonly used in image processing, where the SNR of an image is usually calculated as the ratio of the mean pixel value to the standard deviation of the pixel values over a given neighborhood.

Sometimes SNR is defined as the square of the alternative definition above, in which case it is equivalent to the more common definition:

This definition is closely related to the sensitivity index or d, when assuming that the signal has two states separated by signal amplitude , and the noise standard deviation  does not change between the two states.

The Rose criterion (named after Albert Rose) states that an SNR of at least 5 is needed to be able to distinguish image features with certainty. An SNR less than 5 means less than 100% certainty in identifying image details.

Yet another alternative, very specific, and distinct definition of SNR is employed to characterize sensitivity of imaging systems; see Signal-to-noise ratio (imaging).

Related measures are the "contrast ratio" and the "contrast-to-noise ratio".

Modulation system measurements

Amplitude modulation

Channel signal-to-noise ratio is given by

Output signal-to-noise ratio (of AM receiver) is given by

Frequency modulation

Channel signal-to-noise ratio is given by

Output signal-to-noise ratio is given by

Noise reduction

All real measurements are disturbed by noise. This includes electronic noise, but can also include external events that affect the measured phenomenon — wind, vibrations, the gravitational attraction of the moon, variations of temperature, variations of humidity, etc., depending on what is measured and of the sensitivity of the device. It is often possible to reduce the noise by controlling the environment. 

Internal electronic noise of measurement systems can be reduced through the use of low-noise amplifiers.

When the characteristics of the noise are known and are different from the signal, it is possible to use a filter to reduce the noise. For example, a lock-in amplifier can extract a narrow bandwidth signal from broadband noise a million times stronger.

When the signal is constant or periodic and the noise is random, it is possible to enhance the SNR by averaging the measurements. In this case the noise goes down as the square root of the number of averaged samples.

Digital signals
When a measurement is digitized, the number of bits used to represent the measurement determines the maximum possible signal-to-noise ratio. This is because the minimum possible noise level is the error caused by the quantization of the signal, sometimes called quantization noise. This noise level is non-linear and signal-dependent; different calculations exist for different signal models. Quantization noise is modeled as an analog error signal summed with the signal before quantization ("additive noise").

This theoretical maximum SNR assumes a perfect input signal. If the input signal is already noisy (as is usually the case), the signal's noise may be larger than the quantization noise. Real analog-to-digital converters also have other sources of noise that further decrease the SNR compared to the theoretical maximum from the idealized quantization noise, including the intentional addition of dither.

Although noise levels in a digital system can be expressed using SNR, it is more common to use Eb/No, the energy per bit per noise power spectral density.

The modulation error ratio (MER) is a measure of the SNR in a digitally modulated signal.

Fixed point

For n-bit integers with equal distance between quantization levels (uniform quantization) the dynamic range (DR) is also determined.

Assuming a uniform distribution of input signal values, the quantization noise is a uniformly distributed random signal with a peak-to-peak amplitude of one quantization level, making the amplitude ratio 2n/1. The formula is then:

This relationship is the origin of statements like "16-bit audio has a dynamic range of 96 dB". Each extra quantization bit increases the dynamic range by roughly 6 dB.

Assuming a full-scale sine wave signal (that is, the quantizer is designed such that it has the same minimum and maximum values as the input signal), the quantization noise approximates a sawtooth wave with peak-to-peak amplitude of one quantization level and uniform distribution. In this case, the SNR is approximately

Floating point
Floating-point numbers provide a way to trade off signal-to-noise ratio for an increase in dynamic range. For n bit floating-point numbers, with n-m bits in the mantissa and m bits in the exponent:

Note that the dynamic range is much larger than fixed-point, but at a cost of a worse signal-to-noise ratio. This makes floating-point preferable in situations where the dynamic range is large or unpredictable. Fixed-point's simpler implementations can be used with no signal quality disadvantage in systems where dynamic range is less than 6.02m. The very large dynamic range of floating-point can be a disadvantage, since it requires more forethought in designing algorithms.

Optical signals
This way the noise covers a bandwidth that is much wider than the signal itself. The resulting signal influence relies mainly on the filtering of the noise. To describe the signal quality without taking the receiver into account, the optical SNR (OSNR) is used. The OSNR is the ratio between the signal power and the noise power in a given bandwidth. Most commonly a reference bandwidth of 0.1 nm is used. This bandwidth is independent of the modulation format, the frequency and the receiver. For instance an OSNR of 20 dB/0.1 nm could be given, even the signal of 40 GBit DPSK would not fit in this bandwidth. OSNR is measured with an optical spectrum analyzer.

Types and abbreviations
Signal to noise ratio may be abbreviated as SNR and less commonly as S/N. PSNR stands for peak signal-to-noise ratio. GSNR stands for geometric signal-to-noise ratio. SINR is the signal-to-interference-plus-noise ratio.

Other uses
While SNR is commonly quoted for electrical signals, it can be applied to any form of signal, for example isotope levels in an ice core, biochemical signaling between cells, or financial trading signals. The term is sometimes used metaphorically to refer to the ratio of useful information to false or irrelevant data in a conversation or exchange.

See also

 Audio system measurements
 Generation loss
 Matched filter
 Near–far problem
 Noise margin
 Omega ratio
 Peak signal-to-noise ratio
 Signal-to-noise statistic
 Signal-to-interference-plus-noise ratio
 SINAD
 Subjective video quality
 Total harmonic distortion
 Video quality

Notes

References

External links
 
 ADC and DAC Glossary – Maxim Integrated Products
 Understand SINAD, ENOB, SNR, THD, THD + N, and SFDR so you don't get lost in the noise floor – Analog Devices
 The Relationship of dynamic range to data word size in digital audio processing
 Calculation of signal-to-noise ratio, noise voltage, and noise level
 Learning by simulations – a simulation showing the improvement of the SNR by time averaging
 Dynamic Performance Testing of Digital Audio D/A Converters
 Fundamental theorem of analog circuits: a minimum level of power must be dissipated to maintain a level of SNR
 Interactive webdemo of visualization of SNR in a QAM constellation diagram Institute of Telecommunicatons, University of Stuttgart
 
 Quantization Noise Widrow & Kollár Quantization book page with sample chapters and additional material
 Signal-to-noise ratio online audio demonstrator - Virtual Communications Lab

Engineering ratios
Error measures
Measurement
Electrical parameters
Audio amplifier specifications
Noise (electronics)
Statistical ratios
Acoustics
Sound